Badger Township is in Webster County, Iowa. The population is 1,287 with 646 males and 641 females.

The township has three cemeteries: Blossom Hill, Hovey, and Pioneer.

References

Townships in Webster County, Iowa
Townships in Iowa